USCGC Shoshone was a  of the United States Coast Guard launched on 12 November 1932 and commissioned on 6 January 1933.

Career

Coast Guard - Shoshone 

After being commissioned 10 January 1931 with Captain Leon C. Covell in command, Shoshone was homeported in San Francisco, California and participated in the Bering Sea Patrol.

Royal Navy - Landguard

After being transferred to the British Royal Navy the newly named HMS Landguard (Y56) was commissioned on 20 May 1941. On 8 February 1943, she rescued 48 people from the British merchant Mary Slessor which struck a mine laid by U-118 in the Strait of Gibraltar. On 6 October 1949 she was sold and scrapped.

See also
 List of United States Coast Guard cutters

References

Lake-class cutters
Ships of the United States Coast Guard
World War II patrol vessels of the United States
Ships built in Alameda, California
1930 ships
Banff-class sloops